Myrmex myrmex is a species of antlike weevil in the beetle family Curculionidae. It is found in North America. It develops in dead and dying American sycamore wood.

References

Further reading

 
 

Curculioninae
Articles created by Qbugbot
Beetles described in 1797